290 Square Meters is a retail shop in Amsterdam, the Netherlands. It is best known for being the only retail location in the world where one could buy customized NikeID shoes for a number of years, though it also carries a number of other one-of-a-kind items from brands such as Levi's, Freitag and Arc'teryx Veilance among others.

Founded by Ido de Voos in 2001, it originally started as 90 Square meters on KNSM Island. In its new location right off  Waterlooplein, a former bank vault, it has grown to an internationally recognized retailer of both men's and women's fashion as well as limited edition books, jewelry and scents.

Both the stores original name, 90 Square Meters, and its new name, 290 Square Meters, are derived from the shop's size, so it can be considered space that is retail today and possibly a museum or gallery tomorrow.

In late 2012 it launched a web shop.

References

External links

 290 Square Meter's Site
 Arc'teryx Veilance
 NikeID
 freitag bags

Retail companies of the Netherlands
Shops in Amsterdam